Euseius badius is a species of mite in the family Phytoseiidae.

References

badius
Articles created by Qbugbot
Animals described in 1991